Bažantnice u Pracejovic is a nature reserve near Strakonice in the South Bohemian Region of the Czech Republic.

Flora
The reason for protection of this area is the occurrence of a riparian forest relict in the Otava River bed with relatively preserved tree and herb layer with typical types of riparian forest. For example, in the area grows Aconitum variegatum, Hottonia palustris, Thalictrum aquilegiifolium, Corydalis intermedia, Primula elatior, Carex riparia, or Lemna trisulca.

References

Nature reserves in the Czech Republic
Protected areas in the Strakonice District